Henri Kontinen and John Peers were the defending champions, but lost in the semifinals to Feliciano López and Andy Murray.

López and Murray went on to win the title, defeating Rajeev Ram and Joe Salisbury in the final, 7–6(8–6), 5–7, [10–5]. It was Murray's first doubles title and sixth overall title at the Queen's Club, an all-time record. López became the first player to complete a sweep of both singles and doubles titles at the tournament since Mark Philippoussis in 1997.

Seeds

Draw

Draw

Qualifying

Seeds

Qualifiers
  Jérémy Chardy /  Fabrice Martin

Lucky losers
  Robert Lindstedt /  Artem Sitak

Qualifying draw

References

External links
 Main draw
 Qualifying draw

Doubles